The Intelligence and Information Warfare Directorate (or I2WD) is a component of the US Army Communications-Electronics RD&E Center, based out of Aberdeen Proving Ground.  Consisting of five primary divisions, I2WD forms a Research and Development (R&D) enterprise.

Operations previously resided at Fort Monmouth, NJ.  However, due to the 2005 Base Realignment and Closure act, the majority of I2WD activities were transferred to Aberdeen Proving Ground Sep 2011.

Core capabilities
 Radar/combat identification
 Electronic warfare air/ground survivability equipment
 Information and network operations
 Signals intelligence (SIGINT)
 Modeling and simulation
 Information fusion
 Measurement and signatures intelligence
 Electronic warfare countermeasures
 Intelligence dissemination

References

Communications-Electronics Research, Development and Engineering Center
Military installations in New Jersey
Military communications of the United States
Monmouth County, New Jersey
Military simulation